Enrico Millo (12 February 1865 – 14 June 1930) was an Italian admiral and politician. As a military commander, he led the raid against the Ottoman Navy in the Dardanelles.

Life 

Born in Chiavari, Province of Genoa, he was named guardiamarina in 1884. He participated as a navy officer in the campaigns of Italy in the Horn of Africa, and with the rank of Capitano di Vascello he led the raid of 5 Italian torpedo boats against the Ottoman fleet on 18 July 1912 during the Italo-Turkish War. After the expedition, Millo was named a senator by king Victor Emmanuel III; later he was minister for the navy in the fourth government cabinet headed by Giolitti and in the first headed by Salandra. 

During World War I he held a command post in the Regia Marina. After World War I he was named governor of Dalmatia. From 1923 to 1925 he held a managerial position in the company that owned the harbour of Naples. 

He died in Rome in 1930.

Ships
A submarine in the Cagni class was named after him during World War II.

Notes 

1865 births
1930 deaths
People from Chiavari
Regia Marina personnel
Italian military personnel of World War I
Italian admirals
Italian politicians
Italian military personnel of the Italo-Turkish War